Mugsy's Girls (also known as Delta Pi) is a 1984 film starring pop singer Laura Branigan and Ruth Gordon about a sorority that travels to Las Vegas to enter a mud wrestling competition in order to raise the money to save their house. The film was released theatrically in 1985.

This is one of Gordon's final films (along with the three other films she made around this time that were released posthumously). She plays the sorority house-mother who ends up wrestling at the end. The film also features genre stars Eddie Deezen and Kristi Somers. Although Laura Branigan was quite famous as a singer by the time the filming began, she contributed no music to the film; most songs were performed by fellow cast member Joanna Dierck, who at one point was married to the film's writer and director Kevin Brodie.

Plot

Cast

References

External links

1980s sex comedy films
1984 films
American sex comedy films
Teen sex comedy films
1984 comedy films
Fraternities and sororities
1980s English-language films
1980s American films